The Transport Construction Authority (TCA), formerly Transport Infrastructure Development Corporation (TIDC) prior to July 2010, was an agency of the Government of New South Wales that was responsible for new railway projects in the city of Sydney, Australia. On 1 November 2011 the Transport Construction Authority was subsumed into the newly-formed Transport for NSW.

History
The Transport Infrastructure Development Corporation (TIDC) was formed as part of the Transport portfolio and was charged with delivering a number of major public transport, in particular commuter rail, construction projects across the greater Sydney metropolitan area. The authority oversaw the process of planning, design, regulatory approval and community relations for its projects. Construction was performed by private-sector construction companies. When built, the infrastructure was turned over for management by CityRail.

The former chairman of TIDC was Ron Finlay, who served the role for 5 years. In 2006-2007 the TIDC was responsible for 11 projects under construction, collectively worth over  billion, with another nine projects in the planning phase. Project expenditure for the year totaled A$629 million.

The TIDC was renamed the Transport Construction Authority on 1 July 2010. On 1 November 2011, the Transport Construction Authority was abolished and subsumed into Transport for NSW.

Projects

Transferred to Transport for New South Wales
 Rail Clearways Program
Macarthur turnback
Liverpool turnback
Kingsgrove to Revesby quadruplication
Schofields to Vineyard duplication
 South West Rail Link
 Northern Sydney Freight Corridor Program
Auburn stabling
Commuter Car Park and Interchange Program (remaining projects)

Completed
Rail Clearways Program
Bondi Junction turnback
Berowra third platform
Macdonaldtown stabling
Revesby turnback
Hornsby fifth platform
Lidcombe turnback
Sutherland to Cronulla duplication
Homebush turnback
Quakers Hill to Schofields duplication
 Parramatta Transport Interchange
 Epping to Chatswood railway line
 Chatswood Transport Interchange
 North Sydney station upgrade
Commuter Car Park and Interchange Program (some projects)

See also
 Sydney Metro Authority

References

External links
Transport Construction Authority website

Defunct government entities of New South Wales
Transport in Sydney
Defunct transport organisations based in Australia
2011 disestablishments in Australia